The Nyukzha is a river in Amur Oblast and Transbaikalia, East Siberia, Russian Federation. It is the second largest tributary of the Olyokma river in terms of length and area of its basin. There are a number of inhabited places close to the banks of the river, including Ust-Urkima, Lopcha, Chilchi, Ust-Nyukzha, Larba and Yuktali, mostly with a significant Evenk population. A section of the Baikal–Amur Mainline passes along the river valley. The river is a destination for rafting.

The name of the river originated in the Evenki word "nyukzhach", meaning "to wander".

Course
The Nyukzha is a right tributary of the Olyokma, of the Lena basin. Its source is in Zabaykalsky Krai, in the northern slope of the Nyukzha ridge, a spur of the Urushin Range, of the Olyokma-Stanovik Highlands. 
In its upper course through the highlands it flows fast, forming numerous rapids. It goes roughly northeastwards leaving the Chernyshev Range on the right through a narrow valley. Then it bends and changes to a northwestward direction. Farther downstream the Nyukzha slows down, divides into arms, and forms meanders. Finally it joins the right bank of the Olyokma  from this river's mouth in the Lena. 

The river freezes in October and stays under ice until late April or early May.

See also
List of rivers of Russia
Tyndinsky District

References

External links

День оленевода и охотника отпраздновали в селе Усть-Уркима Тындинского района - Evenk celebration on the ice of the Nyukzha river
Data on the Fish Species Composition in Nyukzha River (Olekma Tributary) and its Basin

Rivers of Amur Oblast
Rivers of Zabaykalsky Krai